The Korisliiga Finals Most Valuable Player (MVP) is an annual award that is handed out to the best player in the Finals of a given Finnish Korisliiga season. The award usually goes to a player that is on the championship team.

Winners

References

Finals MVP
Basketball most valuable player awards
European basketball awards